The Deathless Devil is a 1972 Turkish action film, co-written, produced and directed by Yılmaz Atadeniz, starring Kunt Tulgar as a young man who takes up his father's mantle as masked crimefighter Copperhead to defeat the evil Dr. Satan. The film is a remake of the 1940 serial Mysterious Doctor Satan.

References

External links
 

1972 films
1970s Turkish-language films
Films set in Turkey
Turkish action films
Remakes of Turkish films
1972 action films